West African Insurance Institute is a sub regional insurance education centre in Banjul, The Gambia. The institute trains and certifies insurers from West Africa and offers them certificates. It was established in 1973.

References

Education in the Gambia
Educational organisations based in the Gambia
Insurance schools